Lionel Abelanski (born 22 October 1964) is a French actor.

Life and career
Abelanski was born in Paris, France. He has appeared in television and film roles since 1989. In 1999 he was nominated for the César Award for Most Promising Actor for the film Train of Life (1998).

Filmography

References

External links

1964 births
Living people
Male actors from Paris
French male film actors
French male television actors
20th-century French male actors
21st-century French male actors
Cours Florent alumni
20th-century French Jews